Kristell Lowagie (born Christel Lowagie, 6 March 1980) is a Belgian singer and songwriter.

Biography

Lowagie led the gothic/symphonic metal band Skeptical Minds. She also worked on her solo project SIN.SIN, an electro-pop music; and gave her voice for The Road to Consciousness project, a metal opera. She's now the lead singer of the band Lovelorn Dolls, a dark rock band from Belgium, signed in 2012 on Alfa Matrix label.

Lowagie started singing at age 20, with Adams-Stokes, a Belgian pop-rock band. Together they performed concerts throughout Belgium, and they were in the finals of the Belgian Emergenza contest in 2001.

In 2002, Lowagie was asked by Vincent Lacrosse to join his project Skeptical Minds, an industrial electro metal music. The band played in big metal festivals, together with bands like Epica, Lacuna Coil, After Forever, and Leaves' Eyes. They recorded the album Rent to Kill, and were signed on the US label Sirenette Music Industries. Lowagie left the group in December 2007.

In 2008, Lowagie sang with Valkyre, a symphonic metal band from Belgium.

In 2009, Lowagie was asked to sing for the rock-metal opera The Road to Consciousness. That's where she met her new musical partner Bernard Daubresse. In 2010, they started working on their new band, Lovelorn Dolls. The band released a first EP in 2011. Their album was released in 2013 under Alfa Matrix label.

In 2017, Lowagie released her solo project SIN.SIN, an electro pop music, under Alfa Matrix.

Family

Lowagie is the granddaughter of Jef Lowagie, a Belgian cyclist who competed at the 1928 and 1936 Summer Olympics.
Lowagie is a distant cousin of the singer-songwriter Bob Geldof.

Discography 
EP's

 2004 - SKEPTICAL MINDS - First Experiment (demo)
 2007 - SKEPTICAL MINDS - The Beauty Must Die (FYB Records)
 2011 – LOVELORN DOLLS - An Intense Feeling of Affection (Demo)
 2013 - LOVELORN DOLLS - After Dark (Alfa Matrix)
 2014 – LOVELORN DOLLS - The Thrill (Alfa Matrix)
 2015 - LOVELORN DOLLS - Happy Valentine (Alfa Matrix)
 2016 - LOVELORN DOLLS - An Intense Feeling of Affection, re-issue (Alfa Matrix)
 2017 – LOVELORN DOLLS - Lament (Alfa Matrix)

Albums

 2005 - SKEPTICAL MINDS - Rent to Kill (FYB Records)
 2013 - LOVELORN DOLLS - The House of Wonders (Alfa Matrix)
 2014 - LOVELORN DOLLS - Japanese Robot Invasion (Alfa Matrix)
 2017 - SIN.SIN - Nobody's Heroine (Alfa Matrix)
 2018 - LOVELORN DOLLS - Darker Ages (Alfa Matrix)

References

External links 
 Lovelorn Dolls official website

1980 births
Women heavy metal singers
Living people
Musicians from Brussels
21st-century Belgian women singers
21st-century Belgian singers